Awalgaon  is a village in Bramhapuri taluk of Chandrapur district in India.  

As of 2011, Awalgaon had 1064 families  with a population of 4114, 2038 male and 2076 female.

References

Villages in Chandrapur district